was a Japanese scholar and the founder of the Association for Aid and Relief.

She was born to Yukio Ozaki and  Yei Theodora Ozaki.  Sohma became the first female qualified in simultaneous translation in Japanese history.  In 1979 she established the Association to Aid the Indochinese Refugees, which in 1999 was renamed Association for Aid and Relief.

References

External links

 Biographical data

1912 births
2008 deaths
Japanese activists
Japanese women activists
20th-century Japanese translators